Eupines bituberculata is a beetle in the Staphylinidae family, which is found in New South Wales.

It was first described by Arthur Mills Lea in 1911.

References

Staphylinidae

Insects of Australia
Insects described in 1911